Rinus is a male given name, usually short for Marinus and popular in the Netherlands, and may refer to:

Rinus Bennaars (born 1931), retired Dutch footballer
Rinus Gerritsen (born 1946), Dutch bassist
Rinus Gosens (born 1920), retired football (soccer) player and manager
Rinus Israël (born 1942), former Dutch football player, manager and currently scout
Rinus Michels (1928–2005), Dutch football player and coach
Rinus van den Berge (1900–1972), Dutch athlete mainly in the 100 metres
 Rinus VeeKay (born 2000), Dutch open wheel race car driver. 
Rinus Vreugdenhil (born 1951), bass player in the Dutch heavy metal band Picture

Dutch masculine given names